Mathis der Maler (Matthias the Painter is an opera by Paul Hindemith. The work's protagonist, Matthias Grünewald, was a historical figure who flourished during the Reformation, and whose art, in particular the Isenheim Altarpiece, inspired many creative figures in the early 20th century.

Hindemith completed the opera, writing his own libretto, in 1935. By that time, however, the rise of Nazism prevented Hindemith from securing a performance in Germany. The story, set during the German Peasants' War (1524–25), concerns Matthias's struggle for artistic freedom of expression in the repressive climate of his day, which mirrored Hindemith's own struggle as the Nazis attained power and repressed dissent. The opera's obvious political message did not escape the regime.

Performance history
The opera was first performed at the Opernhaus Zürich on 28 May 1938, conducted by Robert Denzler. On 14 October 1956, a rebuilt Schauspiel Köln in Cologne opened with a gala performance of the opera. On 9 and 11 March in 1939 the opera Mathis der Maler was performed in Amsterdam, conducted by Karl Schmid-Bloss, director of the Opera in Zürich. At the same time the Rijksmuseum Amsterdam made a documentary exhibition of the painting 'The Small Crucifixion' and two drawings by Mathias Grunewald owned by Franz Koenigs. The British premiere was in Edinburgh on 29 August 1952, and it was first given in the United States on 17 February 1956, at Boston University, conducted by Sarah Caldwell.

In contrast to the popular Symphony: Mathis der Maler, the large-scale opera itself is only occasionally staged. A notable US production was that of the New York City Opera in 1995. Hamburg State Opera staged the work in 2005. It was being performed at the Gran Teatre del Liceu in Barcelona when the building was destroyed by a fire in January 1994.

Main roles

Synopsis

Scene 1
In a cloister courtyard Mathis's musings and doubts about his vocation are interrupted by the peasant leader Schwalb and his child Regina. Moved by the peasants' plight, he offers his horse and stays to face the pursuing Sylvester who dares not arrest the cardinal's favorite painter.

Scene 2
A riot between Catholics, Lutherans and students in front of Albrecht's residence in Mainz is averted only by the arrival of the Cardinal himself with relics of St. Martin:

He promises the merchant Riedinger to countermand an order to burn books, but later gives in to Pomerfeld, who points out that he cannot defy Rome. Mathis, reunited with Reidinger's daughter Ursula, is recognized by Sylvester and makes a passionate plea to Albrecht not to join in the suppression of the peasant's revolt. Realizing he cannot change his friend's mind, Albrecht grants him safe passage to join their cause.

Scene 3
The Lutherans are at first outraged when Capito leads soldiers to the stash of hidden books in Reidinger's house ("Ein Verbrechen / Gegen Luther, gegen deutsche Glaubenskraft" [A crime / Against Luther, against the power of German faith]), but appeased when he reveals a letter from Luther to Albrecht suggesting that he demonstrate his advanced views by marrying:

Albrecht, "the strongest clerical prince in Germany" who "... holds / The fate of the Empire in his hands" is in such dire financial straits that it is likely he would agree, and Reidinger asks Ursula to give thought to the matter as it would be to the benefit of both the Lutheran faith and the Empire. Mathis arrives to bid farewell and insists she cannot follow him to the war. When her father returns she gives her consent to the plan.

At the end of scene 3, all men chant a paean to God, their religion and the fatherland:

Scene 4
The peasant army has captured the Helfensteins, marching the Count to execution and humiliating the Countess. Asked for their demands, one of the peasants replies, amongst others, that they do not accept any ruler save the emperor ("Kein Herrscher gilt / Als der Kaiser"). Mathis remonstrates and is beaten down. The federal army arrives and the disheartened peasants prepare for battle but are quickly overrun; Schwalb is killed and Mathis barely saved by the Countess. He flees with the orphaned Regina.

Scene 5
Albrecht discusses his debts and Luther's challenge with Capito and agrees to interview a rich bride. He is astonished when Ursula enters and, dubious of her avowals, reproaches her for lending herself to the scheme. She admits that she is motivated not by love but by her faith to attempt his conversion, and in turn reproaches him for his vacillations and his lack of vision. He appears to be profoundly moved by her plea, but when the others are called in he announces that he will reform his ways by striving to return to his vows and to lead a simple life.

Scene 6

In the Odenwald forest Mathis lulls the haunted Regina to sleep with a description of a concert of angels, she joining in the folksong "" (this is the music of the symphony's first movement). No sooner is she asleep but Mathis, now in the garb of Grünewald's Saint Anthony, is beset by tempters: a figure resembling the Countess Helfenstein offers a life of luxury; Pommersfelden praises power over money; Ursula appears in the guises of a beggar, then a seductress and, led to the scaffold, as a martyr; Capito, now a scholar, tells 'Anthony' the world can be mastered by science and reproaches him for unobjectivity; Schwalb upbraids for his unwarlike compassion. The chorus unite in an enactment of the temptation scene of the Isenheim Altarpiece before the scene suddenly changes to that of Anthony's visit to Saint Paul. Paul/Albrecht consoles Anthony/Mathis and calls him to his duty: "go forth and paint".

Scene 7
Ursula cares for the dying Regina, who confuses Mathis' painting of the dying Christ with her father. Only the sight of Mathis calms her before she dies. In the morning (following the interlude from the Symphony) he is visited by Albrecht who offers his home, but Mathis prefers to spend his last days in solitude. Packing his trunk, he bids farewell to good intentions – a scroll, ambition – compass and ruler, creation – paints and brush, acclaim – a gold chain, questioning – books, and last, kissing a ribbon from Ursula – to love.

List of musical numbers

Recordings
1977: EMI Classical 555 237-2 (CD issue): Rafael Kubelík (cond.), Bavarian Radio Symphony Orchestra & Chorus. Dietrich Fischer-Dieskau (Mathis), James King (Cardinal Albrecht), Ursula Koszut, William Cochran, Peter Meven, Rose Wagemann, Donald Grobe, Gerd Feldhoff, Alexander Malta, Trudeliese Schmidt.
1990: Wergo WER 6255-2: Gerd Albrecht (cond.), WDR Symphony Orchestra Cologne & Chorus. Josef Protschka, Roland Hermann, Victor von Halem, Hermann Winkler, Harald Stamm, Sabine Hass, Heinz Kruse, Ulrich Hielscher, Ulrich Reß, Gabriele Rossmanith, Marilyn Schmiege.
2005: Oehms Classics OC 908: Simone Young, Hamburg Philharmonic Symphony and chorus. Falk Struckmann, Scott MacAllister, Susan Anthony, Inga Kalna, Pär Lindskog. 2005 Hamburg staging. (Libretto not included in booklet.)
2012 Theater an der Wien: Mathis – Wolfgang Koch, Albrecht von Brandenburg – Kurt Streit, Riedinger – Franz Grundheber, Ursula – Manuela Uhl, Hans Schwalb – Raymond Very, Regina – Katerina Tretyakova, Lorenz von Pommersfelden – Martin Snell, Wolfgang Capito – Charles Reid, Sylvester von Schaumberg – Oliver Ringelhahn, Truchsess von Waldburg – Ben Connor, Helfenstein’s Piper – Andrew Owens, Countess Helfenstein – Magdalena Anna Hofmann, Slovak Philharmonic Chorus (chorus master: Blanka Juhaňáková), Vienna Symphony Orchestra, Bertrand de Billy, conductor, (Keith Warner – stage director, Johan Engels – set designer, Emma Ryott – costume designer, Mark Jonathan – lighting designer).

References

Notes

Sources

Bruhn, Siglind, The Temptation of Paul Hindemith, Pendragon, 1998
Hindemith, Paul, Libretto of Mathis der Maler, Schott/AMP (with English synopsis, credited "courtesy of University of Southern California Opera Theatre")

External links 
 Upcoming productions
Site on the altar, with pages on the opera and 2007 Karlsruhe revival (in German)

Operas by Paul Hindemith
German-language operas
Operas
1938 operas
Matthias Grünewald
German patriotic songs
Operas set in the 16th century
Cultural depictions of German men
Cultural depictions of 16th-century painters
Operas set in Germany
Operas based on real people